Cincinnati is an unincorporated community and census-designated place (CDP) in northwestern Washington County, Arkansas, United States. It was first listed as a CDP in the 2020 census with a population of 306.

Cincinnati receives mail delivery from Summers. It is part of the Northwest Arkansas region.

Geography
Cincinnati is in the Ozarks on the southern edge of the Springfield Plateau, near the Boston Mountains. The community developed on the west bank of Cincinnati Creek.

History 
In the early years before 1857, Cincinnati was first known as Buzzard Roost, then Silvia. This early settlement was such a thriving center of commerce that people came from Fayetteville, Arkansas for supplies.

Three of Cincinnati's inhabitants died during the 2010 New Year's Eve tornado outbreak. Another died four days later from injuries sustained in the tornado.

Demographics

2020 census

Note: the US Census treats Hispanic/Latino as an ethnic category. This table excludes Latinos from the racial categories and assigns them to a separate category. Hispanics/Latinos can be of any race.

Education
Cincinnati is in the Siloam Springs Schools school district. The district's sole comprehensive high school is Siloam Springs High School.

Notable person

George W. Bond (1891-1974), graduate of Cincinnati High School, later president of Louisiana Tech University

References

Census-designated places in Washington County, Arkansas
Census-designated places in Arkansas
Unincorporated communities in Washington County, Arkansas
Unincorporated communities in Arkansas